Payal Shakya is a Nepalese-born Australian model. She is the winner of Miss Nepal 2004, which was held in Birendra International Convention Center, Kathmandu. She is currently residing in Sydney, Australia. She works at Optus. While she was Miss Nepal, Payal worked to save the wetlands and rhinos. She was also the ambassador for Cancer Relief Society.

On 21 November 2011, Payal married the lead singer of Uglyz Band, Sarun Tamrakar in Sydney.

References

Miss Nepal winners
Nepalese female models
Nepalese beauty pageant winners
1986 births
Living people
People from Kathmandu
People from Sydney
Nepalese emigrants to Australia
Miss World 2004 delegates
Australian female models
Naturalised citizens of Australia
Australian people of Nepalese descent